Aknazarovo (Aqnazar) is a rural locality (a village) in Akyulovsky Selsoviet, Khaybullinsky District, Bashkortostan, Russia. The population was 151 as of 2010. There are 2 streets.

Geography 
Aknazarovo is located 49 km west of Akyar (the district's administrative centre) by road. Yantyshevo is the nearest rural locality.

References 

Rural localities in Khaybullinsky District